Vanja Ejdus (Serbian Cyrillic: Вања Ејдус; born 1 November 1976) is a Serbian actress.

Early life and education
Born in Belgrade, Ejdus is the eldest child of actor Predrag Ejdus and his wife Milica, an architect; her father's grandparents were among the Jewish people of Belgrade killed in the Holocaust. She studied acting at the Faculty of Dramatic Arts, winning the Sterija award in 2002 while still a student for her role in an adaptation of Hasanaginica.

Career
, Ejdus had had roles in approximately twenty stage and film productions.
In 2009, she played Marina in Wait for Me and I Will Not Come.

Personal life
Ejdus and her husband, Ivan Kostić, an expert in Arabic language and literature, have a daughter.

Selected filmography
 Yu (2003)
 Wait for Me and I Will Not Come (2009)

References

External links

 

1976 births
Living people
Actresses from Belgrade
21st-century Serbian actresses
Serbian film actresses
Serbian people of Jewish descent